Ross Stott (6 January 1988) is an international field hockey player for Scotland and plays club hockey in the Men's England Hockey League Premier Division for East Grinstead Hockey Club.

His brother Niall Stott also plays for Scotland, while his cousin, Craig Strachan, was a senior international.

References

Scottish male field hockey players
1988 births
Living people
East Grinstead Hockey Club players
Men's England Hockey League players